Kalmakanda, originally Karamakhanda, is an upazila of Netrokona District  in the Division of Mymensingh, Bangladesh.

Geography
It has 39275 households in total area 377.41 km2. The upazila is bounded by Meghalaya state of India on the north, Barhatta and Netrokona sadar upazilas on the south, Dharmapasha upazila on the east, Durgapur upazila on the west.

Demographics
According to 2011 Bangladesh census, Kalmakanda had a population of 217,912. Males constituted 49.61% of the population and females 50.39%. Muslims formed 85.48% of the population, Hindus 11.18%, Christians 3.17%, and others 0.18%. Kalmakanda had a literacy rate of 36.58% for the population 7 years and above.

As of the 1991 Bangladesh census, Kalmakanda had a population of 209,360. Males made up 50.99% of the population, and females 49.01%. The over 18 population of Upazila numbers 103,227. Kalmakanda had an average literacy rate of 21.4% (7+ years); the national average is 32.4%.

Administration
Kalmakanda Thana was formed in 1941 and it was turned into an upazila in 1983.

Kalmakanda Upazila is divided into eight union parishads: Barakharpan, Kaitali, Kalmakanda, Kharnai, Langura, Nazirpur, Pogla, and Rangchhati. The union parishads are subdivided into 177 mauzas and 347 villages.

Notable residents
 Abdul Karim Abbasi was the Member of Parliament for constituency Netrokona-1 from 1991 to 1995 and 2001 until 2006.
 Chhabi Biswas  has been the Member of Parliament for constituency Netrokona-1 since 2014.
 Golam Robbani was the Member of Parliament for constituency Netrokona-1 from 1988 until 1990.
 Mustaque Ahmed Ruhi was the Member of Parliament for constituency Netrokona-1 from 2009 until 2014.
 Jalal Uddin Talukder was the Member of Parliament for constituency Netrokona-1 from 1996 until 2001.

See also
Upazilas of Bangladesh
Districts of Bangladesh
Divisions of Bangladesh

References

Upazilas of Netrokona District